Quasar is a Czech aircraft manufacturer based in Dolní Bečva and founded by Karel Haman. The company specializes in the design and manufacture of hang gliders in the form of ready-to-fly aircraft, plus ultralight trike wings.

The company produces a wide range of hang glider wings that has included beginner wings, like the Quasar Tramp, intermediate wings, such as the Quasar 2000 and the Quasar Flavio that was designed by world hang gliding champion Tomáš Suchánek plus the competition topless Quasar Relief wing design.

Aircraft

References

External links

Aircraft manufacturers of the Czech Republic and Czechoslovakia
Ultralight aircraft
Ultralight trikes
Hang gliders